How Did This Get Made? is a comedy podcast on the Earwolf network hosted by Paul Scheer, June Diane Raphael, and Jason Mantzoukas.

Generally, How Did This Get Made? is released every two weeks. During the show's off-week, a ".5" episode is uploaded featuring Scheer announcing the next week's movie, as well as challenges for the fans. In addition to the shows and mini-shows, the How Did This Get Made? stream hosted the first three episodes of Bitch Sesh, the podcast of previous guests Casey Wilson and Danielle Schneider, in December 2015. It has also hosted episodes of its own spin-off podcast, the How Did This Get Made? Origin Stories, in which Blake Harris interviews people involved with the films covered by the main show. In December 2017, an episode was recorded for the Pee Cast Blast event, and released exclusively on Stitcher Premium.

Every episode has featured Paul Scheer as the host of the podcast. The only episode to date in which Scheer hosted remotely was The Smurfs, in which he Skyped in. Raphael has taken extended breaks from the podcast for both filming commitments and maternity leave. Mantzoukas has also missed episodes due to work, but has also Skyped in for various episodes. On the occasions that neither Raphael nor Mantzoukas are available for live appearances, Scheer calls in previous fan-favorite guests for what is known as a How Did This Get Made? All-Stars episode.

List of episodes

Mini episodes

References

External links 
 List of How Did This Get Made? episodes

Lists of podcast episodes
Earwolf